Lafarre may refer to the following places in France:

 Lafarre, Ardèche, a commune in the  Ardèche département
 Lafarre, Haute-Loire, a commune in the Haute-Loire département